Cashcows was a short-lived radio programme that originally aired in September 2005.  There were five half-hour episodes and it was broadcast on BBC Radio 4.  It starred Joanna Kanska, Susan Jameson, Elizabeth Spriggs, Adjoa Andoh, and Colleen Prendergast.

References 
 Lavalie, John. "Cashcows" EpGuides. 21 July 2005. 29 July 2005.

BBC Radio 4 programmes
2005 radio programme debuts